Johan von Sydow (born 1961) is a Swedish director and writer. He is known for his 2011 documentary "Sagan om Jussi" (Saga of Jussi) and internationally as the director of the 2020 documentary film "Tiny Tim: King for a Day".

Career
Johan von Sydow was born in 1961 and grew up in Boden, Sweden. He started working for Sveriges Television in 1993. Between the 2000s and 2010s, he directed several documentaries like "Mare Kandre - Det är jag som är ett geni" and "Sagan om Jussi", the latter which received critical acclaim for focusing on the distinct character of the opera singer Jussi Björling. In 2020, he directed a documentary on American musician Tiny Tim titled "Tiny Tim: King for a Day" which examines the fame and personal life of the musician, with "Weird Al" Yankovic narrating the documentary. The documentary premiered in August 2020 in Canada and is expected to premiere in New York and in selected theatres in the United States on 23 April 2021.

Partial filmography

References

External links

  Svensk-filmdatabas

1961 births
Living people
Swedish film directors
Swedish journalists
Swedish screenwriters